Events in the year 1761 in Norway.

Incumbents
Monarch: Frederick V

Events

Arts and literature
Kongsberg Church is completed.

Births
26 January - Jens Zetlitz, priest and poet (died 1821)
6 December - Erich Haagensen Jaabech, farmer and politician (died 1845)

Deaths
 14 August - Birgitte Christine Kaas, poet and translator of hymns (born 1682).

See also

References